Zakharovo is a rural locality (a selo) in Chernyansky District, Belgorod Oblast, Russia. The population was 281 as of 2010. There are 4 streets.

Geography 
Zakharovo is located 15 km northwest of Chernyanka (the district's administrative centre) by road. Olshanka is the nearest rural locality.

References 

Rural localities in Chernyansky District